Bell Resources (ACN 620 586 334) is an Australian electric vehicle charging and clean energy company founded in 2017.

Bell Resources may also refer to:

 Australian Consolidated Investments (ACN 008 670 924), an Australian company known as Bell Resources between 1984 and 1990, see